U.S. Route 25W (US 25W) is the western branch of U.S. Route 25 from Newport, Tennessee, where US 25 splits into US 25E and US 25W, to North Corbin, Kentucky, where the two highways rejoin.

US 25W has been included in the U.S. Highway System since the system's inception in 1926.

Route description

Tennessee 

US 25W carries the unsigned designation of State Route 9 (SR 9) throughout the state.

US 25 splits into US 25W and US 25E on the west side of downtown Newport. Here, SR 32 goes north on US 25E and US 70/SR 9/SR 35 continue on US 25W. The concurrency then has a full interchange with I-40 (Exit 432 A/B) before US 411/SR 35 separate and turn south. US 25W/US 70/SR 9 then leave Newport and cross into Jefferson County.

Immediately after crossing the line, they intersect SR 363 in Reidtown. They then cross Douglas Lake, parallel to the I-40 bridge. Immediately after crossing the lake, they intersect SR 113. The highway now enters Dandridge and SR 66 joins the concurrency. US 25W/US 70/SR 9/SR 66 then intersect and become concurrent with SR 92, passing by downtown to the north and SR 66 becoming unsigned at this intersection. They then separate from SR 92 and have another interchange with I-40 (Exit 415), with SR 66 separating and having an unsigned concurrency with I-40 west before leaving Dandridge. US 25W/US 70/SR 9 continue west through rural Jefferson County before coming to an intersection with Snyder Road (which connects to SR 66 and Sevierville) and SR 139, becoming concurrent with SR 139 before crossing into Sevier County.

Once across the line, SR 139 separates and turns south towards Kodak, and US 25W/US 70/SR 9 continue west to cross into Knox County.

The highway then has an interchange with US 11E/SR 34 in Carter (also known as Trentville), with US 11E joining the concurrency as they enter Knoxville. US 11E/US 25W/US 70/SR 9 then intersect SR 168 (Governor John Sevier Highway) before crossing a bridge over the Holston River and having another interchange with I-40 (Exit 394), where SR 9 and US 25W run concurrent with the interstate for a short ways before concurrent with I-640 (Exit 385). They then have interchanges with Mall Road (which provides access to Knoxville Center, Exit 8), US 441/SR 33/SR 331 (Broadway, which provides access to Fountain City, Exit 6), and I-75/I-275 (Exit 3A) before separating and US 25W/SR 9 turns north (Exit 3B). US 25W/SR 9 continue through the North Knoxville neighborhood, along Clinton Highway, and then leave Knoxville to enter Powell. In Powell, they intersect and have a short concurrency with SR 131 before leaving Powell and crossing into Anderson County.

The highway then enters Claxton and becomes a very curvy 4-lane undivided highway. In Claxton, US 25W/SR 9 intersects SR 170, then continues north and leaves Claxton and winds its way through rural areas for a few miles to enter Clinton. In Clinton, they intersect SR 61 before going straight through the historic downtown as Main Street. US 25W/SR 9 then leave Clinton and become curvy again before going through Medford to enter Rocky Top (Lake City). In Rocky Top, US 25W/SR 9 go through downtown and intersect and become concurrent with SR 116. The highway intersects US 441/SR 71 (which provides access to Norris Lake and Norris Dam) before coming to an interchange and US 25W/SR 9 becomes concurrent with I-75 (Exit 129), with SR 116 taking over the old route of US 25W/SR 9.

They then cross into Campbell County and enter Caryville, where they separate from I-75 (Exit 134) and become concurrent with SR 63. Immediately afterward, they intersect the northern end of SR 116 and pass by Cove Lake, Cove Lake State Park, and Caryville Dam before leaving Caryville and entering Jacksboro. In Jacksboro, US 25W/SR 9/SR 63 bypass downtown to the north and go through Jacksboro's main business area. The highway now crosses into La Follette, where they go straight through downtown and then US 25W/SR 9 separate from SR 63 and leave La Follette, becoming very curvy again as the road enters mountainous terrain. It then passes through Duff and Habersham before passing through Morley and intersecting SR 90. US 25W/SR 9 finally enter Jellico and have another interchange with I-75 (Exit 160). They then enter downtown and intersect SR 297 before turning north and ending at the Kentucky state line, with US 25W continuing north alone into Kentucky.

Kentucky

Upon entry into Whitley County, Kentucky, US 25W runs parallel with and closely follow I-75 for the rest of its course, including the points where it traverses the towns of Williamsburg and Corbin. It parallels the Clear Fork as the highway travels up a narrow valley, passing through the communities of Red Ash, Saxton, Pleasant View, and Emlyn. US 25W now enters Williamsburg and crosses over the Cumberland River, where it has a short concurrency with KY 92. The highway bypasses downtown along is east side as it passes through neighborhoods along the riverbanks. It then leaves Williamsburg and has an intersection with KY 26 near Wofford before crossing I-75 (exit 15) and winding its way north through farmland and rural areas. US 25W has intersections with KY 90 and KY 1193 before entering Corbin and crossing I-75 for the last time (exit 25). It passes through a business district and some neighborhoods, where it has an intersection with KY 3041 (Corbin Bypass), before meeting back up with KY 26 and passing straight through downtown via a one-way pair between Main Street and Kentucky Avenue. The highway passes through more neighborhoods before crossing a creek into North Corbin and Laurel County. US 25W passes straight through downtown before coming to an intersection north of town, where US 25E and US 25W reunites to become US 25. However, US 25E continues west of this point to terminate at exit 29 of I-75.

History 
US 25W originally ran the current routing of Kentucky Route 26, and KY 90 terminated in downtown Corbin. KY 26 originally ran to KY 90 west of Corbin. At sometime in the 1940s, US 25W was rerouted to its current alignment to provide easier access to Cumberland Falls, and KY 26 ran US 25W's original course between Corbin and Williamsburg.

Major intersections

See also

References

External links

US 25 at KentuckyRoads.com

W
25W
25W
25W
Transportation in Laurel County, Kentucky
Transportation in Whitley County, Kentucky
Transportation in Anderson County, Tennessee
Transportation in Campbell County, Tennessee
Transportation in Knox County, Tennessee
Transportation in Knoxville, Tennessee
Transportation in Sevier County, Tennessee
Transportation in Cocke County, Tennessee
Transportation in Jefferson County, Tennessee